Cobras Fútbol Premier is a Mexican football team that plays in the Liga TDP. They held in the border town of Ciudad Juarez, Chihuahua.

History
The club was founded with the name Cobras de Querétaro, that was run by Grupo Televisa to carry veteran and the basic forces players of America. In the 1985-86 season, they won promotion by defeating Pachuca 3-1 on aggregate, but only lasted a season in top flight, as in 1987, they fell along with León finishing with 31 points in 40 games.

After descending, Alejandro de la Vega bought the franchise and moved it to Ciudad Juarez.  They immediately had success by making it to the finals in their first season and were crowned champions after defeating León, by a score of 1-0 in a game played in the Estadio Azteca on July 12, 1988, with Joaquin Mendoza as manager, achieving automatic promotion to Primera Division.

The first match played in the maximum circuit was an away game against Cruz Azul in Copa MX. At home, they debuted in Olímpico Benito Juárez against Correcaminos. In the 1988-89 season, they had their first meeting against America that ended 0-0. At home, they debuted with a 3-0 victory over the Correcaminos. In their first league tournament, they ended at the 12th position overall and 3rd in group 4.

For the 1989-90 season, Uruguayan Carlos Miloc became manager, doing a good job, but surprisingly he was stopped and his assistant Hector Hugo Eugui took office. Cobras came within 1 point to qualify for the playoffs, because in the last game of the regular season they tied 1-1 with Toluca. They were only 1 point below the Necaxa with 38 units.

In the 1990-91 season, Hector Hugo Eugui would start as a manager and Argentinian Carlos Rodriguez came to replace him. That season's 17th overall was mediocre accomplishment and remained in last place in Group 4.

In the 1991-92 season, Cobras played the Cup tournament, where they were protagonists and reached the final, but Monterrey defeated them by a score of 4-2.

Beginning the regular season, Cobras started regularly but slowly reeled and as a result Cobras fell to Segunda División de México  with a disappointing run of 7 consecutive defeats. Halfway through the season, "Chamaco" Rodriguez was fired and replaced by Joaquin Mendoza, the same coach that would help the team get promoted in the 1987-88 season, but not save the team from relegating again in the 1991-92 season.

Cobras played 3 seasons in the Segunda División de México and in the 1993-94 season, they were near the promotion but were eliminated by the Zacatepec in the semifinal round. In 1994, Primera Division 'A' was born, but due to economic problems Cobras disappeared.

In the Invierno 2001, Saltillo Soccer moved to the border town and Cobras reborn as a subsidiary and dependent Monterrey. In command of Sergio Orduna, the team managed to reach the final of the Apertura 2003 with adverse outcome, falling to the Dorados de Sinaloa during this match Ignacio Battle's performance gave the team a 3-0 lead but unfortunately got injured and had to be substituted. The team collapsed and lost the final and the chance to return to Primera Division. They continued to play 3 more tournaments in Primera Division 'A' with mediocre results until the end of the Clausura 2005 the team disappeared due to debts  and were replaced by Indios

Honours

National Tournaments

 Segunda Division (2): 1985-86, 1987–88
 Runner-up Copa MX in 1991
 Runner-up Apertura 2003 Primera Division "A"

See also
 Cobras Queretaro

External links
 Página de las Cobras de Ciudad Juárez

Footnotes

Ascenso MX teams
Football clubs in Chihuahua (state)
Association football clubs disestablished in 2005
2005 disestablishments in Mexico
Sports teams in Ciudad Juárez